Selected games on Sony's PlayStation 2 video game console offer online gaming or other online capabilities. Games that enable the feature provide free online play through the use of a broadband internet connection and a PlayStation 2 Network Adaptor. Since the service has no official name, it is sometimes referred as either PS2 Network Play, PS2 Network Gaming or PS2 Online.

The service was launched in July 2001 in Japan, August 2002 in North America, and in June 2003 in Europe. On "slimline" models, a network adapter is integrated into the hardware. Some games also allowed online gameplay using a dial-up connection (not available on all models), or LAN play by connecting two network adapters/slimline consoles together directly with an Ethernet cable or through the same router network.

Instead of having a unified online service like SegaNet or Xbox Live, online multiplayer on the PS2 was the responsibility of the game publisher and was run on third-party servers. However, later PS2 online games required the console to be authorized through Sony's Dynamic Network Authentication System (DNAS) before connecting to the server. Unofficial servers also exist which could be connected by setting up the DNS settings to connect to an unofficial DNS server. Most recent PS2 online games have been developed to exclusively support broadband internet access.

The last official online server, which was for Final Fantasy XI, was ultimately shut down on March 31, 2016, with the DNAS following it a couple of days later on April 4, indirectly shutting down several remaining unofficial servers, with the exception of ones that support non-DNAS PS2 titles such as Tribes: Aerial Assault and Tony Hawk's Pro Skater 3. Despite the DNAS shutdown, several fan created servers still exist; most require a DNAS workaround to connect, with some exceptions such as Call of Duty 3 and Need For Speed: Underground.

Adapter 

For the original models (non-Slim) of the PlayStation 2 console, a network adapter was needed to play online and use a hard drive. All versions of the Network Adaptor provide an Ethernet port, while some North American versions also featured a phone-line port for dial-up connection. The newer slimline versions, however, have an Ethernet port (and in some early North American models, a phone-line port) built into them, making the Network Adaptor unnecessary and hard drive use nearly impossible, as well as ruling out any need to keep the network adapter in production.

Playing online games requires that users set up the system's network connection configuration, which is saved to a memory card. This can be done with the Network Startup Disk that came with the network adapter or using one of the many games that had the utility built into them, such as Resident Evil Outbreak, to set up the network settings. The new slimline PlayStation 2 came with a disk in the box by default. The last version of the disk was Network Startup Disk 5.0, which was included with the newer SCPH-90004 model released in 2009.

As of December 31, 2012, the servers for most games have all since been shut down.

Games 

Released in 2001 Capcom vs. SNK 2 was the first ever video game to offer cross-platform play between two competing video game consoles, followed in 2002 by Final Fantasy XI which allowed connections between the Playstation 2 and personal computers. SOCOM U.S. Navy SEALs, released in August of the same year, was one of the first video games that allowed voice chat on a console.

Compatibility 
PAL games that supported online gaming display a WITH NET PLAY logo on their cover. North American games feature an "Online" icon in the lower right corner of the cover; on games that do not support dial-up connectivity, "broadband only" is also found on the logo.

LAN tunneling 
Over time, most game servers have been shut down. However, computer programs such as XBSlink, SVDL and XLink Kai allow users to achieve online play for some PS2 games by using a network configuration that simulates a worldwide LAN.

See also 
PlayStation Network
XLink Kai
List of PlayStation 2 online games

References 

Multiplayer video game services
Online video game services
Computer-related introductions in 2001
Online (Network)